Delong is an unincorporated community in Aubbeenaubbee Township, Fulton County, Indiana.

History
Delong was originally called Marshland, and under the latter name was platted in 1884.

Geography

References

Unincorporated communities in Fulton County, Indiana
Unincorporated communities in Indiana